T. S. Narayanasami (born 18 May 1949) is a former banker and the first MD & CEO (2009 - 2011) of United Stock Exchange of India, a currency derivatives exchange. His previous positions include:

Chairman and Managing Director of Bank of India
Chairman of the Managing Committee of Indian Banks' Association
 Chairman and Managing Director of Andhra Bank
 Chairman and Managing Director of Indian Overseas Bank
Director, New India Assurance Co. Ltd., Mumbai
President of the Governing Council of the Indian Institute of Banking and Finance
Chairman of the Governing Board of Institute of Banking Personnel Selection
T.S. Narayanasami has been credited for helping scale up business opportunities to various banks as a leader. While he was the Executive Director of Punjab National Bank, the bank became the first bank to network all its branches.

References
T. S. Narayanasami 

1949 births
Living people
Indian bankers